Voodoo tata is a 2018 independent Polish comedy film directed and written by Piotr Matwiejczyk.

The plot revolves around the protagonist, a 35-year-old man, freeloading off his father. The father is fed up with the lazy son and makes desperate attempts to influence him. He sends him to a job centre, gives him orders and sanctions, tries to shape his life but is not met with any positive reaction. The son, at the recommendation of a friend, creates a voodoo doll of his father as he wants to show him what it is like when someone controls another person.

The film was entirely shot and set in Mogilno.

References

External links
Film Polski profile
Filmweb profile
IMDB profile

2018 comedy films
2018 films
Polish comedy films
2010s Polish-language films
Films set in Poland
Films shot in Poland
Polish independent films
2018 independent films